Fireman's Wedding is an EP by Joe Henry, released in 1994 (see 1994 in music) which followed shortly after the album release of Kindness of the World, the parent release for this EP.

Track listing
 "Fireman's Wedding" – 4:25
 "Hello Stranger" (Live) – 2:52
 "Dark as a Dungeon" (with Billy Bragg) – 4:28
 "Stranger" – 2:34
 "Friend to You" (Live) – 4:50

Notes
 Tracks 1 and 5 written by Joe Henry.
 Track 2 written by A.P. Carter.
 Track 3 written by Merle Travis and Elvis Presley.
 Track 4 written by Howard and Barney.

References 

1994 EPs
Joe Henry albums
Albums produced by Joe Henry